The Orchestre national d'Île-de-France is a French symphony orchestra with its administrative base in Alfortville.

The orchestra, made up of ninety-five permanent musicians, gives around a hundred concerts each season, thus offering Ile-de-France residents a wide variety of programs spanning three centuries of music.

The orchestra receives funding from the Conseil régional d’Île-de-France and the French Ministry of Culture.

The precursor orchestra to the current ensemble was the Orchestre symphonique d'Île de France.  In 1974, at the instigation of the culture minister Marcel Landowski, this orchestra was reorganised into the Orchestre national d'Île de France.  Since 1996, the orchestra has been administratively situated in Alfortville.

Past music directors include Jacques Mercier (1982-2002), Yoel Levi (2005-2012), and Enrique Mazzola (2012-2019). The current music director is Case Scaglione, starting with the 2019-2020 season.

The orchestra gives concerts in a number of cities and venues, including the following:
 Philharmonie de Paris, Paris
 Théâtre Alexandre Dumas, Saint-Germain-en-Laye
 Théâtre Espace Coluche, Plaisir
 Théâtre Romain Rolland, Villejuif
 Opéra de Massy, Massy
 Centre culturel Jacques Prévert, Villeparisis
 Théâtre Sénart, Lieusaint
 Centre des Bords de Marne, Le Perreux-sur-Marne
 Conservatoire Jean-Baptiste Lully, Puteaux
 Centre culturel Saint-Ayoul, Provins

Music directors
 Jean Fournet (1974–1982)
 Jacques Mercier (1982–2002)
 Yoel Levi (2005–2012)
 Enrique Mazzola (2012–2019)
 Case Scaglione (since 2019)

References

External links
 Official French-language webpage of the Orchestre national d'Île de France

French orchestras
Musical groups established in 1974
1974 establishments in France
Musical groups from Île-de-France